The Harold Morton Landon Translation Award is a $1,000 award by the Academy of American Poets, for a published translation of poetry from any language into English.  A noted translator chooses the winning book.

It's an award mentioned by the National Endowment for the Humanities, when awarding the National Humanities Medal.

References

American poetry awards
Awards established in 1976
Translation award winners
Translation-related lists